Colours is the fifth studio album by English boy band Blue. It was released on 6 March 2015 and marked the band's first release with Sony Music. The album features six original songs and four cover songs. The album's lead single "King of the World" premiered on 20 January 2015. Colours debuted at number 13 on the UK Albums Chart.

Background and production
Band member Lee Ryan stated that the album was initially set to be a concept album, consisting entirely of covers of songs by artistes who inspired the band during their childhoods and early years in the music industry, including the likes of Marvin Gaye. The idea for the album came about during a flight home from the European leg of their Roulette tour. The band were then contacted by producer Brian Rawling who invited them to his private studio in Surrey to record with him. Whilst recording some of the covers which the band had selected, Rawling offered the band the chance to write some original material with several of his well-known contacts, including the likes of Paul Barry and Mark Taylor, whom Rawling had previously worked with on material for artists such as Enrique Iglesias. As a result of this, the band wrote seven original songs and thus it was decided that the album would become a combination of the original material as well as four carefully selected covers. The album was later trimmed to include six of the original songs, with "Oh Girl" (which was listed as track 11 on product listings for the album) being subsequently removed.

Webbe stated that the track "Flashback" was one of the most poignant songs that the band had ever written, and that it was designed to be a song which everyone could relate to in some way or another. The song was written following a discussion in which the band reminisced about their former heights following the success of All Rise and One Love. The band took to the road in March and April 2015 on their Colours of Blue tour, where they perform the entire album live aside from the final track, "Endless Love". They have also updated some of their back catalogue to include elements of the soul-pop genre which appears on Colours.

Commercial performance
The album missed the top 10 in the UK, debuting and peaking at number 13, and subsequently the band were dropped by their record label Sony on 8 April 2015.

Track listing

Charts

Release history

References

2015 albums
Blue (English band) albums
Albums produced by Brian Rawling